The Clear Horizon is an American soap opera which ran on CBS Daytime from July 11, 1960 to March 10, 1961 and February 26 to June 15, 1962. Manya Starr created the program and was its head writer.

Premise
The Clear Horizon (titled The Army Wife in the pre-production phase) revolved around the problems of astronauts and their wives at Cape Canaveral, Florida. In the show's first episode, Roy Selby (Ed Kemmer) was moved from his post in Alaska to The Pentagon, which gave him a new commission in Florida. Selby and his wife Anne (Phyllis Avery) tried adjusting to their new lives, with Anne feeling attraction to another man. Along with the show's unique theme, it was one of the first daytime dramas to be broadcast from California (CBS Television City in Los Angeles) and one of the first such programs to shoot location footage.

Ratings
The Clear Horizon, which was presented live in its initial run was cancelled in March 1961. It returned to the airwaves in February 1962, and was then taped instead of being presented live. This time, the show focused on Anne dealing with life on her own and Roy being trapped behind enemy lines. There was also more emphasis on the characters of Sgt. Harry Moseby and his wife Frances (Eve McVeagh) in the second season.

Veteran soap opera writer and creator Irving Vendig (radio's Perry Mason, Search for Tomorrow, The Edge of Night) was a writer of the show following its return.

The Clear Horizon was never a big hit with the viewing audience as a whole, even in the 1960–1961 season. The low ratings of the show - its 1961-1962 ratings were 3.5, putting it at the bottom of the daytime ratings list - ensured its permanent cancellation in June 1962, at which point Anne and Roy would be reunited.

Cast
Notable cast members included Beau Bridges, Lee Meriwether, Ted Knight, William Roerick, Denise Alexander, and Eve McVeagh.

The background shown over the title and closing sequences was the sun setting over the Pacific Ocean, accompanied by a piano theme by Kip Walton and a voiceover entailing future programs. Bern Bennett was the show's announcer.

References

External links
 
 Memorable TV page (archived)
 IMDB page, cast list included

1960 American television series debuts
1962 American television series endings
American live television series
American television soap operas
Black-and-white American television shows
CBS original programming
English-language television shows
Television series about space programs
CBS network soap operas